Hickey Freeman is a manufacturer of suits for men and boys, based in Rochester, New York, US, founded in 1899.  The Hickey-Freeman Co. is the most distinguished of the once booming men's clothing industry based in Rochester at the start of the 20th century.  Hickey Freeman tailored clothing continues to be made in the same storied Rochester facility opened in 1912. 

The Hartmarx Corporation bought the company in 1964 and after several changes of ownership, Grano Retail Investments acquired the company including the Rochester factory in 2013. 
Authentic Brands Group   currently  owns the brand. Hickey Freeman is not affiliated with the similarly-named H. Freeman, a brand owned by Individualized Apparel Group.

History
During the 1880s and 1890s, Jeremiah G. Hickey (1866–1960) was a bookkeeper for Wile, Brickner & Wile, then the largest manufacturer of men's clothing in Rochester.  His close friend Jacob L. Freeman (died 1925) was a private contractor of the firm.  Together with fellow Wile, Brickner & Wile employees Thomas Mahon and George A. Brayer, they formed Hickey, Freeman, & Mahon Co. in 1899. Since Jeremiah ("Jerry") Hickey contributed the most capital, and Mahon made no original investment, the name was changed in 1900 to the Hickey-Freeman Co.  

In 1902, the company was able to take over the business and the larger premises of Michael Kolb & Co.  Hickey-Freeman grew even more, and in 1908 it merged with Beckel, Baum & Leopold Co., retaining the Hickey-Freeman name.  The president of Beckel, Baum & Leopold Co. was Emmett Baum, who became vice-president of Hickey-Freeman Co. after the merger.  Baum was largely responsible for Hickey-Freeman's decision in 1908 to manufacture only high quality clothing.  At that time, ready-to-wear suits were seldom made with hand-craftsmanship of any quality, but Hickey-Freeman recognized the importance of quality in the manufacture of men's clothing.

By 1912, Hickey-Freeman Co. had amassed enough capital and business to build a larger, more modern factory on N. Clinton Ave. on the city's northern outskirts.  Known as The Temple, this location was chosen in order to retain the company's skilled workers, after a survey showed that a majority of the company's employees lived within walking distance of this area.  Although the new factory was one of the most complete facilities of its kind in the country, it became necessary for Hickey-Freeman to add space to the building twice more during the 1920s, to accommodate the company's increased volume and over 1,700 employees.

In 2004, the factory underwent extensive renovations, funded in part by $4 million in state taxpayer money and $1 million from Rochester city taxpayers.

In 2012, Authentic Brands Group, an intellectual property corporation with a mandate to acquire, manage and build long-term value in prominent consumer brands, purchased Hickey Freeman along with HMX's other properties. 

In 2013, Grano Retail Investments Inc., also owner of luxury tailored menswear brand Samuelsohn Ltd., acquired the assets of Hickey Freeman including the Rochester, NY factory.  Today, Hickey Freeman tailored clothing continues to be made in the same storied Rochester facility, as it has been since 1899.

In 2020, amid the coronavirus outbreak, Hickey Freeman shifted its production to manufacture masks and other protective equipment for doctors and medical workers.

Presidents

See also
Oxxford Clothes
Brooks Brothers
J. Press
Hartmarx
Paul Stuart

References

External links
 
 Transcript from CNN about Hickey Freeman
 Rochester's Hickey Freeman Company Keeps Tradition Alive

Clothing manufacturers
Clothing companies established in 1899
Clothing retailers of the United States
Manufacturing companies based in Rochester, New York
1899 establishments in New York (state)
Authentic Brands Group